BTS World (stylized in all caps) is a mobile video game developed by South Korean studio Takeone Company Corp and published by Netmarble. Players take the role of BTS' manager, going through various journeys with each of the seven members from 2012, prior to their debut, to 2019.

Release 
The game was released on June 26 to iOS and Android systems in over 175 countries.

Gameplay 
BTS World is a visual novel styled video game, where most of the story relies on clicking through interactions between the user and game characters. The game is based on conversations and choices that impact the later chapters. The player can also style the characters and play a card game to achieve a specific score.

The game uses real photos and voice recordings of the BTS members. Its official website has galleries of photos and videos of the members as the game characters.

Another mode, called "Another Story", has similar gameplay but has different stories, as each of them focuses on the player and only one member of BTS as if they were not together back then.

Characters 
Based on the descriptions on the game's official website, there are seven different characters in "Another Story".

Developer 
It was reported that BTS World was in development for two years. Netmarble claimed that the group's strong fanbase "leads to a good potential market for creating a brand-new game." The game is based on the members' true personalities.

Media coverage 
Before released, the game received significant media coverage. CNBC said the game "will offer opportunities for microtransactions." MTV reports for people who are not familiar with the band, "the game could become a powerful learning tool for anyone just getting into their music."

Awards and nominations

Soundtrack 
The game features original music from the group. An accompanying soundtrack album, BTS World: Original Soundtrack, was released worldwide on June 28, 2019.

The soundtrack was supported by three collaboration singles: "Dream Glow" by Jin, Jimin, and Jungkook featuring British singer Charli XCX (June 7),  "A Brand New Day" by  J-Hope and V featuring Swedish singer Zara Larsson (June 14), and "All Night" by  RM and Suga featuring American rapper Juice Wrld (June 21). On June 26, the game's official theme song and the soundtrack's lead single, "Heartbeat", was revealed in-game after its release.

References 

2019 video games
Android (operating system) games
Band-centric video games
BTS
Golden Joystick Award winners
IOS games
Video games developed in South Korea
Video games set in 2012
Video games set in 2019
Video games set in the 2010s
Visual novels
Fiction about social media
Netmarble games
Single-player video games